Admiral Mitchell may refer to:

Andrew Mitchell (Royal Navy officer) (1757–1806), British Royal Navy admiral
David Mitchell (Royal Navy officer) (c. 1650–1710), British Royal Navy vice admiral
Francis Mitchell (Royal Navy officer) (1876–1946), British Royal Navy admiral
William Mitchell (Royal Navy officer) (c. 1745–1816), British Royal Navy vice admiral